Viktor Mikhaylovich Gusev (30 January 1909 – 23 January 1944) wrote lyrics to accompany several patriotic Soviet military tunes, including 'Polyushko Pole' and 'March of the Artillerymen'.

He wrote the play Spring in Moscow, which was the first Soviet musical theatre, staged by New Theatre under Nikolay Akimov in the early 1950s. It was later made into a film of the same name.

References

1909 births
1944 deaths
Writers from Moscow
People from Moskovsky Uyezd
Russian male poets
Soviet male poets
Soviet poets
Soviet screenwriters
20th-century Russian poets
Male screenwriters
Soviet dramatists and playwrights
Soviet translators
20th-century translators
Moscow State University alumni
Stalin Prize winners
Burials at Novodevichy Cemetery